John Kerr (23 November 1959 – 4 June 2006) was an English footballer who played at centre forward for Tranmere Rovers, Bristol City, Stockport County and Bury. He made 181 appearances for Tranmere, of which 154 were in the Football League, and scored 45 goals.

He subsequently worked as a youth coach at Walsall and Academy Manager at Cardiff City. He died suddenly while on holiday in France with his family.

References

Tranmere Rovers F.C. players
Bristol City F.C. players
Stockport County F.C. players
Bury F.C. players
1959 births
2006 deaths
Sportspeople from Birkenhead
Association football forwards
English footballers
English Football League players